Street reclaiming is the process of converting, or otherwise returning streets to a stronger focus on non-car use — such as walking, cycling and active street life. It is advocated by many urban planners and urban economists, of widely varying political points of view.  Its primary benefits are thought to be:

Decreased automobile traffic with fewer automobile accidents and less smog
Reduced summer temperatures due to less asphalt and more green spaces
Increased pedestrian traffic which also increases social and commercial opportunities
Increased gardening space for urban residents
Better support for co-housing and infirm residents, e.g. suburban eco-villages built around former streets

Reclaim the Streets
An early example of street reclamation was the Stockholm carfree day in 1969.

Some consider the best advantages to be gained by redesigning streets, for example as shared space, while others, such as campaigns like "Reclaim the Streets", a widespread "dis-organization", run a variety of events to physically reclaim the streets for political and artistic actions, often called street parties. David Engwicht is also a strong proponent of the concept that street life, rather than physical redesign, is the primary tool of street reclamation.

See also

References

External links
 RTS — Reclaim the Streets
 Park(ing)
 UK's Streets Alive's carfreeday.org.uk
 International Car Free Day - Thailand – 22 September
 What if everyone had a car? by the BBC World News

Urban planning
Road transport